Maximilien Gardel (18 December 1741, in Mannheim – 11 March 1787, in Paris) was a French ballet dancer and choreographer of German descent. He was the son of Claude Gardel, ballet master to King Stanisław Leszczyński, and elder brother by 17 years of Pierre Gardel.

Gardel débuted at the Académie royale de Musique in Paris in 1759 and five years later became a soloist. Sharing roles as principal dancer (danseur noble) with Gaétan Vestris, Gardel took steps to distinguish himself from his rival in 1772: in the reprise of Rameau's Castor et Pollux, he danced with neither mask nor wig (then judged unimaginable) so as not to be confused with the other dancer.

In 1773 Gardel, with Jean Dauberval, became Vestris' assistant as ballet master. In 1781, Gardel took over the position (succeeding Noverre).

Upon Gardel's death in 1787, his brother Pierre succeeded him as ballet master.

Selected works
 1777 : La Chercheuse d'esprit
 1777 : Ninette à la cour
 1778 : Phaon
 1779 : Mirza et Lindor
 1781 : La Fête de Mirza
 1783 : La Rosière
 1784 : L'Oracle
 1785 : Le Premier Navigateur
 1786 : Les Sauvages
 1786 : Le Pied de bœuf
 1786 : Le Déserteur
 1787 : Le Coq du village

External links
His ballets and their productions on CESAR

1741 births
1787 deaths
French ballet masters
French male ballet dancers
French choreographers
Ballet choreographers
People from Mannheim
French people of German descent
Paris Opera Ballet étoiles
18th-century French ballet dancers
Paris Opera Ballet artistic directors